A what if chart (Whif chart, WHIF analysis, etc.) is a visual tool for modeling the outcome of a combination of different factors.  The table can represent actual results or predicted outcome based on combinations of parameters.  It is a visual equivalent of asking the question, what if...? or 'what happens if...?' multiple times for each and every factor being considered.

Other uses
What if charts are also used as classroom tools to facilitate cognition.  In business this is also known as a WHIF (What Happens If) analysis.

Example 1 - Selecting a restaurant

Table 1 attempts to predict best choice of restaurant for a group of friends based on each one's food preferences.  Each person rates the choices based on the food they prefer, the food they can tolerate, and the food they dislike.  All their preferences are put in a what if chart to determine how happy they will be with the choice.

Assuming Mandi and Logan are willing to compromise, clearly Italian food would be the best choice for the group.

Example 2 - Analysis of color genetics

Table 2 is simplified example from Mendelian genetics involving controlled breeding of flowers.  It demonstrates the outcome when flowers of different colors are crossed with each other.  The dominant color gene (Red) decides the outcome when crossed with recessive color gene (yellow) producing a hybrid (Red*) flower.  If either parent possesses the dominant gene, the table shows the outcome that results.

See also
 What If (disambiguation)
 Sensitivity analysis
 Punnett Square

References
Whitman, J.L. Dinner Table Analysis of Color Genetics. See 
Royer, Nichole; Rat Genetics, AFRMA Rat & Mouse Tales, 1997. See 

Business models